is a 2001 Japanese film by director Shōhei Imamura. This was Imamura's last feature film. It was entered into the 2001 Cannes Film Festival.

Plot 
Warm Water Under A Red Bridge focuses on the troubles of a Japanese "everyman" who finds a new life with an unusual woman in a small fishing village. Imamura's last film contains considerable commentary on the search for happiness.

This romantic comedy tells the story of a salaryman who has been laid off from his job at an architectural firm in Tokyo and is undergoing marital difficulties.  When his old friend dies, he travels to the small fishing town of Himi, Toyama to find a treasure that the old man had hidden in a house there decades before. He does not find what he expects, but takes a job with local fishermen and becomes romantically involved with a woman with an exaggerated proclivity towards female ejaculation.

Cast
 Kōji Yakusho as Yosuke Sasano
 Misa Shimizu as Saeko Aizawa
 Mitsuko Baisho as Mitsu Aizawa
 Mansaku Fuwa as Gen
 Isao Natsuyagi as Masayuki Uomi
 Yukiya Kitamura as Shintaro Uomi
 Hijiri Kojima as Mika Tagami
 Toshie Negishi as Tomoko Sasano
 Sumiko Sakamoto as Masako Yamada
 Gadarukanaru Taka as Taizo Tachibana
 Mickey Curtis as Nobuyuki Ohnishi
 Takao Yamada as Kazuo Namamura
 Katsuo Nakamura as Takao Yamada
 Kazuo Kitamura as Taro

References

External links 
 
 Warm Water Under a Red Bridge at Rotten Tomatoes
 Mes, Tom. (2001) Warm Water Under a Red Bridge (film review) at Midnight Eye

2001 films
2001 romantic comedy films
2000s sex comedy films
Nikkatsu films
2000s Japanese films